Crowley's Ridge (also Crowleys Ridge) is a geological formation that rises 250 to  above the  alluvial plain of the Mississippi embayment in a  line from southeastern Missouri to the Mississippi River near Helena, Arkansas.  It is the most prominent feature in the Mississippi Alluvial Plain between Cape Girardeau, Missouri, and the Gulf of Mexico.

This narrow rolling hill region rising above the flat plain is the sixth, and smallest, natural division of the state of Arkansas. The southern part is protected within Ozark–St. Francis National Forest.

Most of the major cities of the Arkansas Delta region lie along Crowley's Ridge. It was named after Benjamin Crowley, known as the first American settler to reach the area, sometime around 1820. The Civil War Battle of Chalk Bluff was fought on Crowley's Ridge on May 1–2, 1863.

Composition and origin
The ridge is primarily composed of the windblown glacially derived sediment known as loess. It contrasts greatly with the flat table land around it and with the black soil that makes up the delta. The highest point on the ridge in Arkansas is "Legacy Mountain" at the Craighead County solid waste site south of Jonesboro.

Prevailing winds blow dust into the river fogs. The fog wetted dust tends to fall and make loess deposits on the downwind sides of rivers, such as the east and north sides of the Mississippi River, as well as the east side of the Black River. These loess deposits are a classic example of periglacial loess. Crowley's Ridge is a natural loess accumulation point.  A comparable example of this type of deposit is the Loess Hills in northwestern Missouri and western Iowa.

At one time, the ridge was thought to have been an island between the Mississippi River and Ohio River that was isolated as a long low hilly ridge after the rivers changed course millions of years ago. Recent seismic evidence, however, questions the fluvial origin by focusing on uplift along ridge bounding faults.

There is evidence that the area's elevation has increased over the years, suggesting that uplift is still taking place. This alternative explanation posits a link between the ridge and the nearby New Madrid Seismic Zone.

Soils and vegetation
The flora and fauna of the ridge seem more closely related to the Tennessee hills to the east than to the Ozark Mountains to the west.  This unique habitat has been protected by the establishment of several state and city parks, the St. Francis National Forest, recreational lakes, and in 1997 a national scenic byway, the Crowley's Ridge Parkway.

The soils in this area are moderately fertile and sometimes rich.  The land is moderately rugged, discouraging row-crop agriculture.  These soils are easily eroded.  There is some commercial agriculture in the loessal plains area of the ridge. The ridge is surrounded by the fertile lands of the delta region. The vegetation is predominantly oak and hickory forests, similar to vegetation found in the Appalachian Mountains. Examples are the tulip tree (or yellow poplar) and the American beech. Ferns and flowers abound here, including the American bellflower, fire pink, butterfly weed, cardinal flower, blue lobelia, phlox, verbena, wild hydrangea, hibiscus, aster, and yellow jasmine. The low-lying areas around the ridge were once much swampier, and the ridge provided a natural and more healthful place for settlers to establish homes.  The ridge became a natural north-south communications link for the region, since travel along the ridge was much easier than through the swampy lowlands.

Fossils
The region adjacent to the ridge is covered with thick deltaic soils, and few fossils are found except in gravel pits.  These pits sometimes reveal the teeth of large mastodons, mammoths and horses, which roamed the continent as recently as 10,000 years ago. Crowley's Ridge contains important exposures of fossiliferous Tertiary sediments and contains the only documented Miocene exposures in the state.  A silicified conifer stump weighing several tons was unearthed near Wittsburg, and many more were found around Piggott.  Mastodon bones were found within the city limits of Helena at the southern end of the ridge.  Near Forrest City, in the bed of Crow Creek, a deposit of oyster shells estimated to be nearly 7,000,000 cubic yards in size was discovered.

Namesake

Crowley's Ridge is named after Benjamin Crowley (1758–1842), the first American settler of the Ridge near Paragould, Arkansas. Crowley is buried in the Shiloh Cemetery in Greene County, Arkansas, and a monument marks the spot. The cemetery is part of Crowley's Ridge State Park. Next to Crowley's grave, other early settlers of the ridge are buried in unmarked graves.

Crowley's Ridge Nature Center
The Forrest L. Wood Crowley’s Ridge Nature Center in Jonesboro, Arkansas features self-guided exhibits about area's topography and natural history and wildlife of Crowley’s Ridge. Operated by the Arkansas Fish and Game Commission (AGFC) and opened in 2004, the Center includes an exhibit area, discovery room, observation tower, meeting rooms, auditorium, and gift shop. Outside there are trails through wetlands, forest and prairie, and a 1/4 mile universally accessible trail and boardwalk around a pond. The Center offers many activities and nature education programs. It is named after Forrest L. Wood, a former commissioner and supporter of the AGFC.

References

External links 

 Semo.edu: Crowley's Ridge
 USGS GNIS webpage—
 Arkansas State Parks: official Crowley's Ridge State Park website
  Encyclopedia of Arkansas history and culture.net: Crowley's Ridge State Park
 St. Francis National Forest at Crowley's Ridge — at southernmost end of ridge, adjacent to Mississippi River.
 Crowley's Ridge Nature Center

 
Ridges of Arkansas
Mississippi embayment
U.S. Interior Highlands
Landforms of Clay County, Arkansas
Landforms of Craighead County, Arkansas
Landforms of Cross County, Arkansas
Landforms of Greene County, Arkansas
Landforms of Lee County, Arkansas
Landforms of Phillips County, Arkansas
Landforms of Poinsett County, Arkansas
Ozark–St. Francis National Forest
Geology of Arkansas
Regions of Arkansas
Geology of Missouri